Ignacio 'Nacho' Zabal Almazán (born 14 February 1987) is a Spanish professional footballer who plays as a goalkeeper for CD Alfaro.

Club career

Spain
Born in Alfaro, La Rioja, Zabal came through the youth ranks at CA Osasuna and made his senior debut for their reserves in Segunda División B on 19 March 2006, in a 1–1 away draw against CF Badalona. On 28 June 2011, he was loaned to Segunda División team CD Numancia for the upcoming season, and appeared in his first professional match on 7 September in the second round of the Copa del Rey, saving a penalty from Ander Lafuente in a shootout victory at FC Cartagena following a goalless draw.

Zabal was loaned out again the following campaign, to second-tier club SD Huesca. Despite only six competitive appearances and relegation, he signed a permanent deal with the Aragonese for the following year. 

After that, Zabal continued competing in division three, with CD Alcoyano, CD Toledo, Arandina CF, SD Amorebieta and CD Calahorra.

Atlético Ottawa
On 2 April 2020, Zabal signed with Atlético Ottawa. He made his debut in their first ever match in the Canadian Premier League, a 2–2 draw against York9 FC on 15 August.

Zabal appeared in all league games during the season. On 26 February 2021, he was released.

Later years
On 10 June 2021, Zabal joined UE Sant Julià in the Andorran Primera Divisió. He returned to his country only two months later, however, agreeing to a deal at CD Tudelano.

Career statistics

References

External links

1987 births
Living people
Association football goalkeepers
Spanish footballers
Footballers from La Rioja (Spain)
Segunda División players
Segunda División B players
Primera Federación players
Segunda Federación players
CA Osasuna B players
CA Osasuna players
CD Numancia players
SD Huesca footballers
CD Alcoyano footballers
CD Toledo players
Arandina CF players
SD Amorebieta footballers
CD Calahorra players
CD Tudelano footballers
Canadian Premier League players
Atlético Ottawa players
UE Sant Julià players
Spanish expatriate footballers
Expatriate soccer players in Canada
Expatriate footballers in Andorra
Spanish expatriate sportspeople in Canada
Spanish expatriate sportspeople in Andorra